Artemps is a commune in the department of Aisne in the Hauts-de-France region of northern France.

Geography
Artemps is located 10 km southwest of Saint-Quentin and 7 km northeast of Ham.  It can be accessed by the D32 road from Saint-Simon in the south passing through the heart of the commune and the village and continuing to Seraucourt-le-Grand in the north.  There are a few country roads in the commune and the old Saint-Simon – Clastres Air Base is in the southeast of the commune. The commune is mostly farmland with a forest belt along the whole northern border.

The Somme river flows along the northern border forming part of the border and the Canal of Saint-Quentin passes through parallel to the river inside the commune.

Neighbouring communes and villages

Administration

List of Successive Mayors of Artemps

Population

Sites and Monuments

St. Martin's Church
This church is one of the few in France to have a steeple topped by two cocks. The church has undergone many changes over the years but was not completely destroyed during the two world wars. Most windows have been preserved and on one of them the master glassmaker represented the church.

See also
Communes of the Aisne department

References

External links
Artemps on the old IGN website 
Bell Towers website 
Artemps on Géoportail, National Geographic Institute (IGN) website 
Arthem on the 1750 Cassini Map

Communes of Aisne